Oldroydiella is a genus of horse flies in the family Tabanidae.

Species
Oldroydiella albocincta Zeegers, 2017
Oldroydiella expatriata (Oldroyd, 1957)
Oldroydiella fallax (Macquart, 1846)
Oldroydiella oldroydi (Paulian, 1962)
Oldroydiella splendida (Oldroyd, 1963)
Oldroydiella tenebrosa Dias, 1959

References

Brachycera genera
Tabanidae
Diptera of Africa